Orchards is a census-designated place (CDP) in Clark County, Washington, United States. The population was 19,556 at the 2010 census.

History
According to one account, in 1846 an employee of the Hudson's Bay Company named Dugald McTavish surveyed land near the fur trading post Fort Vancouver. McTavish described four plains in the area of thick woods. Officials at the trading post numbered the plains, and so the area was originally known as Fourth Plain. Wanting a more unique name, residents voted in 1904 to change the name to Orchards, after the many fruit trees in the area.

Geography
Orchards is located in southern Clark County at  (45.683873, -122.529267). It is bordered to the northeast by Hockinson, to the north by Brush Prairie, to the west by Five Corners, and to the south by the city limits of Vancouver. The neighborhood of Sifton is in the southern part of the CDP.

Demographics
As of the census of 2000, there were 17,852 people, 5,918 households, and 4,704 families residing in the CDP. The population density was 2,601.4 people per square mile (1,004.8/km2). There were 6,175 housing units at an average density of 899.8/sq mi (347.5/km2). The racial makeup of the CDP was 87.39% White, 1.75% African American, 0.88% Native American, 4.11% Asian, 0.59% Pacific Islander, 1.84% from other races, and 3.44% from two or more races. Hispanic or Latino of any race were 4.53% of the population. 19.9% were of German, 9.3% Irish, 8.8% American and 6.6% English ancestry according to Census 2000.

There were 5,918 households, out of which 49.6% had children under the age of 18 living with them, 62.4% were married couples living together, 11.1% had a female householder with no husband present, and 20.5% were non-families. 14.3% of all households were made up of individuals, and 2.6% had someone living alone who was 65 years of age or older. The average household size was 3.02 and the average family size was 3.34.

In the CDP, the age distribution of the population shows 34.2% under the age of 18, 8.3% from 18 to 24, 36.9% from 25 to 44, 16.5% from 45 to 64, and 4.1% who were 65 years of age or older. The median age was 29 years. For every 100 females, there were 99.8 males. For every 100 females age 18 and over, there were 99.2 males.

The median income for a household in the CDP was $49,216, and the median income for a family was $50,330. Males had a median income of $37,716 versus $26,576 for females. The per capita income for the CDP was $17,866. About 4.6% of families and 6.7% of the population were below the poverty line, including 9.1% of those under the age of 18 and 6.9% of those age 65 or over.

References

Census-designated places in Clark County, Washington
Census-designated places in Washington (state)